Alpha-actinin-4 is a protein that in humans is encoded by the ACTN4 gene.

Alpha actinins belong to the spectrin gene superfamily which represents a diverse group of cytoskeletal proteins, including the alpha and beta spectrins and dystrophins.  Alpha actinin is an actin-binding protein with multiple roles in different cell types.  In nonmuscle cells, the cytoskeletal isoform is found along microfilament bundles and adherens-type junctions, where it is involved in binding actin to the membrane.  In contrast, skeletal, cardiac, and smooth muscle isoforms are localized to the Z-disc and analogous dense bodies, where they help anchor the myofibrillar actin filaments.  This gene encodes a nonmuscle, alpha actinin isoform which is concentrated in the cytoplasm, and thought to be involved in metastatic processes.  Mutations in this gene have been associated with focal and segmental glomerulosclerosis.

Interactions
Alpha-actinin-4 has been shown to interact with PDLIM1, Sodium-hydrogen exchange regulatory cofactor 2, Collagen, type XVII, alpha 1, CAMK2A, CAMK2B, MAGI1 and TRIM3.

See also
 Focal segmental glomerulosclerosis

References

Further reading

External links
 

EF-hand-containing proteins
Human proteins